Beat the Champ is the fifteenth studio album by The Mountain Goats, released on April 7, 2015 on Merge Records. The release is a concept album on professional wrestling, though frontman John Darnielle has stated that several of its songs are "really more about death and difficult-to-navigate interior spaces than wrestling."

It is the first album to feature multi-instrumentalist and current member Matt Douglas; as well as the first album since Heretic Pride to feature former member Erik Friedlander

Release
The album was announced by Merge on January 20, 2015, after which the second track, "The Legend of Chavo Guerrero," was released for streaming on the label's SoundCloud page. Shortly afterwards it became available for pre-order, where the large number of orders caused the site to crash. The song received praise from Guerrero as well his son Chavo Guerrero Jr., and Guerrero also appeared in a music video for the song alongside wrestlers Ray Rosas, Joey Ryan and Ryan Nemeth.

The second single, and sixth track of the album, titled "Heel Turn 2" was released on Merge Records' SoundCloud page on February 28, 2015. The following day, it officially premiered on an episode of the podcast Welcome to Night Vale.

The album was released in Australia and New Zealand on April 3, 2015 on Merge Records and distributed by Remote Control Records, in the United States and Canada on April 7, 2015 on Merge Records, and in Europe on April 13, 2015 on Merge Records.

Critical reception

Beat the Champ received largely positive reviews from contemporary music critics. At Metacritic, which assigns a normalized rating out of 100 to reviews from mainstream critics, the album received an average score of 79, based on 24 reviews, which indicates "generally favorable reviews".

Several critics praised Beat the Champ for providing an accessible interpretation of professional wrestling, such that listeners not interested in the sport could still enjoy the album. Writing for Exclaim!, Jer Fairall called the record "yet another highlight in a career overflowing with them," in large part due to the group's "sonic adventurousness, matched with Darnielle's singular presence as a storyteller and a songwriter."

Track listing

Personnel
John Darnielle – acoustic guitar, vocals, piano, keyboards, lyrics, composition
Peter Hughes – bass, electric guitar
Jon Wurster – drums, percussion
Brad Cook – vocals (background)
Phil Cook – organ, vocals (background)
Matt Douglas – woodwind, woodwind arrangement
Erik Friedlander – strings, string arrangement
Nathan Golub – steel guitar
Austin Nevins – guitar
Rob Carmichael – graphic design, typography
Leela Corman – cover illustration, additional illustrations
Brandon Eggleston – producer
Brent Lambert – mastering
Scott Solter – additional production, mixing

References

External links
John Darnielle's announcement of the album on the band's website
Merge Records Beat the Champ store page

The Mountain Goats albums
2015 albums
Albums produced by Brandon Eggleston
Professional wrestling-related mass media
Concept albums
Merge Records albums